Miss Universe New Zealand is the New Zealand national Beauty pageant which feeds into the international Miss Universe competition. Qualification for Miss Universe New Zealand is based on regional pageants and/or personal interviews (necessary due to lack of regional pageant in some areas).

History
New Zealanders  have contested 44 Miss Universe pageants since its inception in 1952 and is one of 33 countries to win the title. After no entrants were sent to Miss Universe in 2004 and 2005, a new national pageant, Miss Universe New Zealand, was created in 2006.

New Zealand's most successful entrant came in 1983 when Lorraine Downes won the Miss Universe title. The country's only other top five placing came when Delyse Nottle was second runner-up to Shawn Weatherly in 1980. New Zealand has also had three semi-finalist placings, in 1962, 1981 and 1992.

New Zealand is one of only 12 countries to win two or more Miss Photogenic awards,  won by Carole Robinson (1969), Delyse Nottle (1980), and Samantha MacClung (2015).

The pageant will allow between the ages of 18 and 27 and are a New Zealand citizen.

International crowns 
 One – Miss Universe winner: Lorraine Downes (1983)

Titleholders

The winner of Miss Universe New Zealand represents her country at the Miss Universe pageant. On occasion, when the winner does not qualify (due to age) for either contest, a runner-up is sent.

Notes

Miss World
The delegates who represented New Zealand at Miss Universe 1992-1996 also represented New Zealand at Miss World the year before they competed at Miss Universe. The only one of these delegates to place at Miss World was Lisa Marie de Montaulk, who was a semi-finalist in both pageants.

References

External links
Miss Universe New Zealand official website

New Zealand At Miss Universe
Beauty pageants in New Zealand
New Zealand awards